Yevgeny Aleksandrovich Shishlyannikov also written as Evgeny Shishlyannikov and Evgueni Chichliannikov (Евгений Александрович Шишлянников, born  in Irkutsk) is a Russian male weightlifter, competing in the 105 kg category and representing Russia at international competitions. He competed at the 1998 and 1999 World Weightlifting Championships, most recently competing at the 1999 World Weightlifting Championships. He participated at the 2000 Summer Olympics in the 105 kg event.

Major results
 - 1996 European Championships Heavyweight class (405.0 kg)
 - 1997 European Championships Heavyweight class (415.0 kg)
 - 1998 European Championships Heavyweight class (400.0 kg)
 - 2000 European Championships Heavyweight class (410.0 kg)

References

External links
 1997 World Weightlifting, Men 108kg
 

Weightlifters at the 2000 Summer Olympics
Russian male weightlifters
World Weightlifting Championships medalists
Olympic weightlifters of Russia
1975 births
Living people

Place of birth missing (living people)
Sportspeople from Irkutsk